John Sandwith Boys Smith (b Hordle 8 January 1901; d Herne Hill 3 November 1991) was a 20th-century British priest and academic.

Boys Smith was educated at Sherborne School and St John's College, Cambridge. He was ordained in 1927. After a curacy in Sutton Coldfield he returned to St John's where he was to stay until his retirement in 1969. He was its Chaplain  from 1927 to 1934; a Fellow from 1927 until 1959; Tutor from 1934 to 1939; Junior Bursar from  1939 to 1944; Senior Bursar from 1944 to 1959; and Master from 1959 to 1969. He was Vice-Chancellor of the University of Cambridge from 1963 to 1965. In 1968, he was made an honorary fellow of Trinity College Dublin. His aunt was Winifred Boys-Smith, a university professor at Otago University. His brother was Humphry Boys-Smith DSO DSC RNR "one of the most successful Merchant Navy officers serving with the RNR during the second world war." His grandson is Nicholas Boys Smith, founder of Create Streets and Chair of the Office for Place.

References 

People educated at Sherborne School
1901 births
1991 deaths
Anglican Diocese of Birmingham
Alumni of St John's College, Cambridge
20th-century English Anglican priests
Honorary Fellows of Trinity College Dublin
Fellows of St John's College, Cambridge
Masters of St John's College, Cambridge
Vice-Chancellors of the University of Cambridge
Ely Professors of Divinity